This is a season-by-season breakdown of the last undefeated National Football League team. This list indicates the teams who won the most games in a season before suffering their first loss.

The last team in a new season to lose a game has won the Super Bowl twelve times. Before the Super Bowl era, the last undefeated team won fourteen Championship games, four of which were in the AFL. Before playoffs began in the 1933 season, the last undefeated team earned the NFL championship seven times by having the highest winning percentage (ties were not included in calculation). The last team with an unblemished record has made 28 Super Bowl and 26 Championship game appearances.

The Bears have been the last team undefeated 17 times (the last time was during the 2010 season), while the next team, the Rams, have been the last team beaten 12 times as of the 2018 season. The Giants hold the mark for beating the last undefeated team the most times. They have accomplished this 11 times; the last time it happened was in 2010.

Last undefeated team by season
When the teams are sorted, all the names of a franchise are grouped together:
Bears and Staleys
Steelers and Pittsburgh Pirates
Titans and Oilers
Chiefs and Dallas Texans
Jets and NY Titans
Redskins, Washington Football Team, and Commanders

 Note 1: The NFL did not have playoff games until the 1933 season.
 Note 2: Buffalo and Chicago both had 9–1 records (ties not counted in standings then). Chicago was awarded the championship when the league instituted a new tiebreaker rule at the end of the season.

See also 

List of NFL franchise post-season streaks
List of NFL franchise post-season droughts
List of current National Football League consecutive playoff appearances
List of NFL champions (1920–1969)
List of Super Bowl Champions

References 

Teams
National Football League records and achievements